The Shrine of the Book (Heikhal HaSefer) is a wing of the Israel Museum in the Givat Ram neighborhood of Jerusalem that houses the Dead Sea Scrolls and the Aleppo Codex, among others.

History
The building was constructed in 1965, funded by the family of David Samuel Gottesman, a Hungarian-Jewish philanthropist. The building was designed by Armand Phillip Bartos, Frederick John Kiesler and Gezer Heller over a period of seven years.

The shrine is built as a white dome, covering a structure placed two-thirds below the ground, that is reflected in a pool of water that surrounds it. Across from the white dome is a black basalt wall. According to one interpretation, the colors and shapes of the building are based on the imagery of the Scroll of the War of the Sons of Light Against the Sons of Darkness; the white dome symbolizes the Sons of Light and the black wall symbolizes the Sons of Darkness.

As the fragility of the scrolls makes it impossible to display all on a continuous basis, a system of rotation is used. After a scroll has been exhibited for 3–6 months, it is removed from its showcase and placed temporarily in a special storeroom, where it "rests" from exposure.

The shrine houses the Isaiah scroll, dating from the second century BCE, the most intact of the Dead Sea Scrolls, and the Aleppo Codex, dating from the 10th century CE, the oldest existing Hebrew Bible. A facsimile of the original Isaiah scroll is now on display in the Shrine of the Book.

In 2013, the Bank of Israel released an Israeli bullion coin dedicated to the Shrine of the Book.

Gallery

See also
 Tourism in Israel
 List of museums in Israel
 Culture of Israel

References

Further reading
 Meir Ronen, "Keepers of the Scrolls," The Jerusalem Post (July 24, 1997).
 Lelke, Roland, "Der endlose Raum in Frederick Kieslers Schrein des Buches," ("The endless space in Frederick Kiesler's Shrine of the Book")  (book, 187 p.) Shaker Verlag, Aachen, (1999) (German)

External links 

 The Shrine of the Book at the Israel Museum, Jerusalem
 The Shrine of the Book 
 The Israel Museum, Jerusalem

+
Museums in Jerusalem
Dead Sea Scrolls
Domes
Archaeological museums in Israel
Expressionist architecture
Modernist architecture in Israel
Literary museums in Israel
Bible-themed museums, zoos, and botanical gardens